Fosdyke is a village and civil parish in the Borough of Boston, Lincolnshire, England. The population of the civil parish at the 2011 census was 480.

History
The name derives from the Old English and Old Norse "fotrs dic", meaning Fotr's (personal name) ditch.

Fosdyke's Grade II listed Anglican church is dedicated to All Saints. In 1871–72 the church was entirely rebuilt in brick on the site of an older church, in an Early English style. The architect was Edward Browning.

In 1885 Kelly's Directory reported the existence of a Primitive Methodist chapel, a coastguard station, and a row of 400-year-old almshouses, founded by Sir Thomas Middlecott for the Fosdyke and Algarkirk parishes.

Geography
The village is near the mouth of the River Welland, and the parish extends across the river to include both ends of the hamlet of Fosdyke Bridge.

Fosdyke is one of eighteen civil parishes which, together with Boston, form the Borough of Boston local government arrangement, in place since a reorganisation of 1 April 1974 which resulted from the Local Government Act 1972. Fosdyke parish forms part of the Five Villages electoral ward, along with Algarkirk, Bicker, Sutterton and Wigtoft. Hitherto, the parish had formed part of Boston Rural District in the Parts of Holland. Holland was one of the three divisions (formally known as parts) of the traditional county of Lincolnshire. Since the 1888 Local Government Act Holland had been, in most respects, a county in itself.

Community

Fosdyke has a village hall. The nearest post office is in Sutterton. There is no public house. Fosdyke has a Social Club called Fozzy's. A playing field with football pitch and changing rooms, has an enclosed multisport area, used for five-a-side football, basketball and volleyball. Adjacent to the social club building is a children's adventure playground. Situated at the end of the playing field is a bowls club. Businesses include builders, handymen, producers of fruit and vegetables, car body repair and a coach company. Next to Fosdyke Bridge is Fosdyke Yacht Haven, a pleasure boat marina and boatyard. The marina has dry land facilities for sailing craft.

Population

References

External links

 Fosdyke Village
 Goodfellowship Bowls Club

Villages in Lincolnshire
Civil parishes in Lincolnshire
Borough of Boston